NXV can stand for:
 The NXV digital video container format.
 NxV, an image tardy for image analysis.